The Kentucky Athletic Hall of Fame is a sports hall of fame for the U.S. state of Kentucky established in 1963. Individuals are inducted annually at a banquet in Louisville and receive a bronze plaque inside Louisville's Freedom Hall. The Kentucky Athletic Hall of Fame other wise known as the Kentucky Sports Hall of fame, is a non-profit organization funded by the Kentucky Lottery and owned and operated by the Louisville Sports Commission.

Notable Inductees 
Honorees have included Louisville native Muhammad Ali. A three-time world champion and six-time Golden Glove recipient, he won a gold medal in the light heavyweight division at the 1960 Summer Olympics (at age eighteen) and turned professional later that year. Also included is American football player and coach Bo McMillin (who played for Centre College in Danville, Kentucky); and basketball player and coach Pat Riley, who played in college for the Kentucky Wildcats men's basketball team. While at the University of Kentucky, Riley managed to average a double double during his entire career there. He is also a ten-time NBA champion, winning one ring as a player with the Los Angeles Lakers and the rest as a coach and an owner in the NBA. Coach Riley was inducted into the Hall of Fame in 2005. Bob Baffert an American racehorse trainer who trained the 2015 Triple Crown winner American Pharoah and 2018 Triple Crown winner Justify. Baffert's horses have won a record seven Kentucky Derbies, seven Preakness Stakes, three Belmont Stakes, and three Kentucky Oaks. Most recently inducted. A more recent inductee Dwane Casey inducted in the 2021 class who is the head coach for the Detroit Pistons of the National Basketball Association. He is a former NCAA basketball player and coach, having played and coached there for over a decade before moving on to the NBA.

The 2013 class included people such as Jerry Carroll who was a golf professional, Donna Bender a student-athlete/athletic director at Sacred Heart Academy, University of Louisville basketball player Pervis Ellison, Calvin Borel who was a Kentucky horse racer, Pro football player for the Pittsburgh Steelers Dwayne D. Woodruff, and Tennis player Julie Ditty.

Inducted in the 2015 class were tennis player Mel Purcell,( he captured the 1980 NCAA doubles title with Rodney harmon and was named an all-American.) women's basketball coach Paul Sanderford, basketball player Sharon Garland, college basketball manager and King of the Bluegrass Men's Basketball Tournament founder and director Lloyd Gardner, Major League Baseball umpire Randy Marsh, track and field athlete Boyd Smith, and Lexington's Keeneland Race Course. Scott Davenport, the current men's basketball coach at Bellarmine University was also inducted.

The 2016 class included American football player Shaun Alexander, basketball player Darel Carrier, college basketball coach Scott Davenport, basketball player Kyra Elzy, high school basketball coach Philip Haywood, Kentucky Wesleyan basketball play-by-play announcer Joel Utley, and the Lakeside Swim Club. Kyra Elzy is a Kentucky native and currently holds the position as the University of Kentucky's Women's Basketball Head Coach. She also played basketball for the University of Tennessee and assisted for their team after her career.

Selection committee
The 2021 Selection Committee has the following members:

 Jeff Bidwell, WPSD-TV
 Drew Deener, ESPN Radio
 Jody Demling, iHeart Media
 Mike Fields, retired Lexington Herald Leader staff writer
 Jason Frakes, Courier Journal
 Kendrick Haskins, WAVE 3
 Reina Kempt, Courier Journal
 Zack Klemme, The Daily Independent
 Mark Mathis, Owensboro Messenger-Inquirer
 Marques Maybin, ESPN Radio
 Brian Milam, WKYT-TV
 Steve Moss, WKYT-TV
 Kevin Patton, The Gleaner
 Kent Spencer, WHAS-TV
 Mark Story, Lexington Herald-Leader

Inductees 
The Hall of fame has been honoring athletes for the past 58 years. These are some of the athletes inducted in the past 6 years. Here is the link to the full list of inductees.

2021 

 John Asher - Kentucky Derby ambassador. He is known as the voice and face of horseracing in Kentucky.
 Dwane Casey - American Professional basketball coach who attended Union County High School in Morganfield, Kentucky and played four years at the University of Kentucky winning a National Championship in 1977-78. He began His coaching career at the Western Kentucky University before becoming the first African American assistant coach at The University of Kentucky, before moving to the NBA.
 Romeo Crennel - American football coach. Before becoming a defensive coordinator, he was a star at Western Kentucky, where he was a four-year starter and a team captain as a senior in 1969. He then embarked on his coaching career that spanned six decades and included five Super Bowl rings as an assistant.
 Rachel Komisarz Baugh - American swimmer, Olympic gold medalist, and former world record-holder. She swam at the University of Kentucky and became a seven-time All American swimmer and three-time SEC Champion by the end of her four years at the University.
 Keith Madison - Head coach of the Kentucky Wildcats baseball team from 1979 to 2003. He remains the most winningest baseball coach in program history with 735 wins.
 Elmore Smith - Former American professional basketball player. Played at Kentucky State University and went on to play in the NBA for the Buffalo Braves.

2020 
 Pete Browning - American professional baseball player that was a pioneer for the major league games, which included several seasons with the Louisville Colonels.
 Anna May Hutchison- Louisville native, she played in the All-American Girls Professional Baseball League.
 Clarence "Cave" Wilson- Basketball player. Wilson led the Horse Cave, KY, Colored School to 65 consecutive basketball victories in the 1940s. He was a forward and a point guard for the Harlem Globetrotters (1949-1964)

2019 
 Derek Anderson- American former professional basketball player. In 1996, Anderson helped the University of Kentucky win the NCAA Men's Basketball      Championship as part of a team that featured nine future NBA players under their coach Rick Pitino, known as the “untouchables”
 Deion Branch- is a former American football player for the NFL. He played college football as a wide receiver at Louisville under coach John L. Smith. Branch was named the Most Valuable Player of Super Bowl XXXIX.
 William Exum was the head of the Kentucky State University Physical Education Department and later head of the Athletics Department. He coached the KSU men's cross country team to an NCAA Division II championship in 1964. He was also the manager of the United States Track and Field teams at the 1972 and 1976 Olympics.
 Ralph Hacker spent 34 years on the UK Radio Network. He served as the men's basketball analyst for many years with broadcaster Cawood Ledford
 Willis Augustus Lee was a Kentucky native and a skilled sport shooter that won seven medals in the 1920 Olympics shooting events, including five gold medals. He was tied with teammate Lloyd Spooner for the most anyone had ever received in a single Olympics. Their record stood for 60 years.
 Nate Northington- He was the first African-American to play in a college football SEC game with the Kentucky Wildcats.

2018 

 Bob Baffert
 Sam Ball 
 Bob Beatty
 Bernie Bickerstaff
 Ken Ramsey
 Nicky Hayden

2017 

 Mike Battaglia
 Howard Beth
 Rodger Bird
 Rob Bromley
 Swag Hartel
 Kenny Klein
 Dennis Lampley
 Marion Miley

2016 
 Shaun Alexander
 Darel Carrier
 Scott Davenport
 Kyra Elzy
 Philip Haywood
 Joel Utley
 Lakeside Swim Club

*Selection on hiatus 1965

**Selection on hiatus 1967-1974

**Selection on hiatus 1976-1984

References

Notes

External links
 Official website
 List of inductees

Sports in Kentucky
State sports halls of fame in the United States
All-sports halls of fame
Awards established in 1963
1963 establishments in Kentucky
Non-profit organizations based in Louisville, Kentucky
Halls of fame in Kentucky